Senusret (Greek: Sesostris; also transcribed as Senwosret based on Coptic; and as Usertesen in older literature) is the name of several Ancient Egyptians:

 Senusret I, pharaoh (12th Dynasty)
 Senusret II, pharaoh (12th Dynasty)
 Senusret III, pharaoh (12th Dynasty)
 Sesostris, pharaoh described by Herodotus, possibly to be identified with one or more of the above
 Senusret IV, pharaoh (13th or 16th Dynasty)
 Senusret (vizier)
 Senusret (nomarch), 12th Dynasty nomarch at Elkab

Ancient Egyptian given names
Theophoric names